Amacayacu National Natural Park is a national park located along the Amazon River in the Amazonas Department in the south of Colombia.   The word "Amacayacu" means "River of the Hamocs" in the indigenous language Quechua. The Ticuna people currently inhabit a part of the park.

The park comprises 4,220 square kilometres of jungle, a significant portion of which is annually flooded by the Amazon River during the wet season. The park's elevations vary from 200 to 300 meters above sea level, and temperatures in the park vary only slightly on an annual basis, from 26 to 28 degrees Celsius.

The park is of considerable interest to scientists. Many zoological specimens have been collected in the park.

Traveling
In order to travel to the Amacayacu National Park, travelers must arrive in the city of Leticia then embark by boat upriver to the park itself. In the park visitors can do different activities such as trips along the Amazon river to different islands like Isla de los Micos where you can find hundreds of monkeys, Mocagua's island where one can see Victoria Regia or lotus flower and one of the most interesting activities: a trip up the Amazon River to Tarapoto Lake which has botos (Amazon river dolphins).

The park includes accommodations that consists of a maloka where travelers can sleep with a group of people in hammocks or cabins for 2 to 4 travelers.

Travelers must be very careful about mosquitos when the sun goes down. Travelers are advised to wear shirts with long sleeves and long trousers.

History
The park was created in 1975.

References

External links
The park's page at Parques Nacionales Naturales de Colombia 
Cano Correa, Marcela. Título:	Manejo comunitario de fauna silvestre en el P.N.N Amacayacu, Colombia
 PROCESO DE TARAPOTO SOBRE CRITERIOS E INDICADORES DE SOSTENIBILIDAD DEL BOSQUE AMAZONICO - Consulta Colombiana de Validación
 Amacayacu Vacations & Tour

National parks of Colombia
Protected areas established in 1975
Tourist attractions in Amazonas Department
1975 establishments in Colombia
Geography of Amazonas Department
National Monuments of Colombia